"Where You Goin' Now" is a song by the band Damn Yankees. The power ballad was released as a single from their second album Don't Tread and peaked at No. 20 on the Billboard Hot 100, making it their second and final top 40 hit.

Track listing
All songs written by Jack Blades, Ted Nugent & Tommy Shaw.
 "Where You Going Now" (Edit) – 4:27
 "Where You Going Now" (Live version) – 4:46
 "High Enough" (Live version) – 4:36
Tracks 2 & 3 recorded live from the Rocky Mountain Jam in Denver, Colorado.

Personnel

Damn Yankees 
Tommy Shaw – guitars and vocals
Ted Nugent – guitars and vocals
Jack Blades – bass guitar and vocals
Michael Cartellone – drums

Additional musicians 
 Robbie Buchanan – keyboards

Production
Executive Producer – Michael Ostin
Executive Producer – ECM Management/Bruce Bird, Doug Banker and Bud Trager (Tracks 2 & 3)
Mixing – Chris Lord-Alge
Engineer – Ron Nevison

References

1990s ballads
1992 songs
1992 singles
Song recordings produced by Ron Nevison
Songs written by Jack Blades
Songs written by Tommy Shaw
Songs written by Ted Nugent
Damn Yankees (band) songs
Warner Records singles
Glam metal ballads